is the former head coach of the Osaka Evessa in the Japanese Bj League.

Head coaching record

|-
| style="text-align:left;"|Osaka Evessa
| style="text-align:left;"|2012-2013
| 27||7||20|||| style="text-align:center;"|Fired|||-||-||-||
| style="text-align:center;"|-
|-

References

Living people
Japanese basketball coaches
Osaka Evessa coaches
Year of birth missing (living people)